Insider is the second album of the Manchester alternative rock band Amplifier. It was released in 2006 by the German-based label SPV on 29 September in Germany and Austria then in the rest of Europe on 2 October.

Track listing
All songs by Sel Balamir
"Gustav's Arrival" - 3:34
"O Fortuna" - 6:22
"Insider" - 4:30
"Mongrel's Anthem" - 4:26
"R.I.P" - 3:35
"Strange Seas of Thought" - 6:03
"Procedures" - 5:15
"Elysian Gold" - 4:50
"Oort" - 1:31
"What Is Music?" - 6:05
"Hymn of the Aten" - 5:48
"Map of an Imaginary Place" - 6:59

Credits
Sel Balamir – Guitar, vocals and production
Neil Mahony – Bass / Typewriter
Matt Brobin – Drums
Steve Lyon - Recording
Chris Sheldon – Mixing
Kevin Metcaffe - Mastering

External links
Lyrics Contains lyrics to all Amplifier songs.

Amplifier (band) albums
2006 albums
SPV/Steamhammer albums